The Great Falls Explorers were a team in the Continental Basketball Association founded in 2006.  The team played their home games at the Four Seasons Arena in Great Falls, Montana. The franchise was branded 'Explorers' in honor of Lewis and Clark traveled through the area. The Explorers, previously coached by Steve Aggers, was coached by Scott Wedman for the 2007–2008 season.  The team's front office is led by General Manager Ryan Acra.

History
The Explorers were originally owned by Apex Sportstainment (present owners of the Butte Daredevils and Minot SkyRockets). The team's first coach, Steve Aggers, previously coached the College of Great Falls basketball program.  In their inaugural season, the Explorers recorded a 24-24 record but finished short of the playoffs.  The Explorers had two CBA all stars in guard Malik Moore and forward Jamar Howard.  The CBA Rookie of the Year was Explorers power forward Travis Garrison. The Explorers averaged just over 700 in attendance per game.  During the offseason, Kermit Young and Steve Aggers were not asked to return for another season. The team ceased operations after the 2006–07 season.

See also
Billings RimRockers
Butte Daredevils
Montana Golden Nuggets

References

External links
Official Website

Basketball teams established in 2006
Basketball teams disestablished in 2008
Continental Basketball Association teams
Sports in Great Falls, Montana
Basketball teams in Montana
2006 establishments in Montana
2008 disestablishments in Montana